Eugene Charles Stringer (May 29, 1903 – June 1, 1985) was a professional American football player and a college football and college basketball coach. He played for one season for the Cleveland Bulldogs of the National Football League (NFL) in 1925. Stringer served as the head football coach (1926, 1930–1931) and head basketball coach (1926–1927, 1930–1932) at Saint Francis University in Loretto, Pennsylvania.

References

1903 births
1985 deaths
American football fullbacks
American football linebackers
Basketball coaches from Ohio
Cleveland Bulldogs players
John Carroll Blue Streaks football players
Saint Francis Red Flash football coaches
Saint Francis Red Flash men's basketball coaches
Sportspeople from Cleveland
Players of American football from Cleveland